Kvakovce is a village and municipality in Vranov nad Topľou District in the Prešov Region of eastern Slovakia.

History
In historical records the village was first mentioned in 1345.

Geography
The municipality lies at an altitude of 200 metres and covers an area of 33.744 km². It has a population of about 439 people.

External links
 
 
Stats

Villages and municipalities in Vranov nad Topľou District